Johnny Cash with His Hot and Blue Guitar! is the debut studio album by American singer Johnny Cash, released on October 11, 1957. The album contained four of his hit singles: "I Walk the Line," "Cry! Cry! Cry!," "So Doggone Lonesome," and "Folsom Prison Blues." It was re-issued on July 23, 2002, as an expanded edition, under the label Varèse Vintage, containing five bonus tracks, three being alternate versions of tracks already on the original LP. In 2012, Columbia Records reissued the album with 16 additional non-album Sun Records tracks as part of its 63-disc Johnny Cash: The Complete Columbia Album Collection box set. In 2017, 60 years after the original release, the album was remastered under the title Johnny Cash with His Hot and Blue Guitar! (Definitive Expanded Remastered Edition).

This was one of the first albums ever issued on Sam Phillips' Sun Records label.

Background
Cash auditioned for a place on the music label Sun Records in 1955, but he failed to impress its founder Sam Phillips after presenting himself as a gospel singer. Cash was told to come back with a more commercial sound, as Phillips believed gospel wouldn't sell. Cash returned with the songs "Hey Porter!" and "Cry! Cry! Cry!" and subsequently released them as his debut single on Sun Records in July 1955. On the recording, he was backed by Luther Perkins on guitar and Marshall Grant on bass, dubbed "The Tennessee Two" by Phillips. ("Hey Porter" was not included on the original Sun album, but it was included in later reissues by other labels.)

"Cry! Cry! Cry!" became a commercial success, entering the country charts at #14.

His second single, "Folsom Prison Blues", was released in December 1955 and reached the country Top Five in early 1956.

His final single on With His Hot and Blue Guitar!, "I Walk the Line", continued his success, reaching number one on the country charts and staying there for six weeks, eventually crossing over into the pop Top 20.

Track listing

On the Varèse CD reissue, "Country Boy" is not the original "full band" version from the LP but rather an acoustic version with just Cash and his guitar, which is the demo version; however, the "full band" version is available on iTunes. "Country Boy" was re-recorded for his 1996 album Unchained during his American Recordings period.

See Johnny Cash: The Complete Columbia Album Collection for the track listing of the extended edition included in the 2012 box set.

Arizona-based record store chain Zia Record Exchange reissued the album on an exclusive clear orange vinyl as a limited run of 500 copies in October 2020.

Personnel
Johnny Cash - vocals, rhythm guitar

The Tennessee Two
Luther Perkins - lead guitar
Marshall Grant - bass

Technical
Sam Phillips - producer
Cary E. Mansfield - reissue producer
Bill Dahl - liner notes, reissue producer
Dan Hersch - digital remastering
Bill Pitzonka - art direction

Charts
Singles - Billboard (United States)

References 

1957 debut albums
Johnny Cash albums
Albums produced by Sam Phillips
Albums recorded at Sun Studio
Sun Records albums